MK-9470 is a synthetic compound, which binds to the CB1 cannabinoid receptor and functions as an inverse agonist.

References

Cannabinoids
CB1 receptor antagonists
Nitriles
Phenol ethers
Pyridines